Osmanabad District (pronunciation: [usmaːnabaːd̪]) (Transliteration: Usmanabad Jil'hā) is an administrative district in the Marathwada region in the Indian state of Maharashtra. The district headquarter is located at Osmanabad. The District of Osmanabad derives its name from the last ruler of Hyderabad, the 7th Nizam, Mir Osman Ali Khan, of which the region was a part till 1947.

Officer

Members of Parliament
Omraje Nimbalkar (SHS (UBT))

Guardian Minister

list of Guardian Minister

District Magistrate/Collector

list of District Magistrate / Collector

Location
Osmanabad district lies in the southern part of state. It lies on the Deccan plateau, about 600 m above sea level.  Parts of the sina, Manjira and Terna River flow through the district.  The district is located on the south side of the Marathwada region between latitude 17.35 to 18.40 degrees north, and latitude 75.16 to 76.40 degrees east.

Osmanabad District is bordered by the Beed District to the north, Latur District to the east, Solapur District to the west, Ahmednagar district to the north-west and the Bidar and Kalaburagi districts of state of Karnataka to the south. Most of the district lies in the hilly areas of the Balaghat Range.

Climate
The rainy season starts from mid-June and continues till the end of September. The climate is humid in October and November and dry and cool from mid-November to January. From February to June the climate is dry and becomes increasingly hot. During summer the temperature of Osmanabad district is low compared to other districts of Marathwada region. The average annual rainfall in the district is 760.40 mm. Temperature Max.: 42.1 °C; Min.: 8 °C

Tahsils
There are eight talukas (tahsils) in Osmanabad district.
 Bhoom
 Kalamb
 Lohara
 Omerga
 Osmanabad
 Paranda
 Tuljapur
 Vashi

Paranda is a historical place known for the Paranda Fort.

Tuljapur is a major taluka town, about 45 km from Solapur, 25 km from Osmanabad town and 40 km from Hyderabad national Highway at Naldurga.

Tuljapur is best known for its Tulja Bhavani Mandir. It is said that Tulja Bhavani mata had offered sword to Chattrapati Shivaji Maharaj (not verifiable) and his son Chattrapati Sambhaji Maharaj re-built the temple. Omerga is a densely populated taluka in Osmanabad. The Tata Institute of Social Sciences, Mumbai also has a School of Rural Development (the "Rural Campus") at Tuljapur.

Kalamb is a major taluka, 55 km from district headquarter Osmanabad. Kalamb city is old city with river Manjara flowing nearby. Major APMC market is main attraction. The taluka is blessed by Yedeshwari Devi, whose temple located at Yermala, 25 km from kalamb.

Demographics

In the 2011 census Osmanabad district had a population of 1,657,576, roughly equal to the nation of Guinea-Bissau or the US state of Idaho. This gave it a ranking of 298th among district of India (out of a total of 640). Its population growth rate over the decade 2001-2011 was 11.69%. Osmanabad had a sex ratio of 920 females for every 1000 males, and a literacy rate of 76.33%. 16.96% of the population lived in urban areas. Scheduled Castes and Scheduled Tribes made up 16.00% and 2.17% of the population respectively.

At the time of the 2011 Census of India, 85.42% of the population in the district spoke Marathi, 5.89% Hindi, 4.25% Urdu and 2.04% Lambadi as their first language.

Politics
The Shivsena (SHS), Congress (IND), NCP, BJP and BSP are the major political parties in Osmanabad district.

Osmanabad's representation in the Indian Parliament (Lok Sabha) is via the Osmanabad constituency which also includes a piece of northern Solapur district (Barshi) and a piece of southern Latur district (Ausa). Current Member of parliament from Osmananbad loksabha constituency is Omprakash Raje Nimbalkar Osmanabad constituency is formed by six Assembly constituencies i.e. Osmanabad, Omerga, Tuljapur, Paranda Boom, these four from Osmanabad district, Barshi from Solapur District, and Ausa from Latur District.

There are four constituencies for the Maharashtra Legislative Assembly (Vidhan Sabha): the Paranda constituency, Osmanabad constituency, Tuljapur constituency, and Umarga constituency.

Transport
Railway 

A small portion of the Barshi light railway connecting Latur-Barshi-Kurduvadi passed through northern fringe of Osmanabad district until 2007. The rail track was converted to broad gauge and the track alignment was changed southwards to pass near Osmanabad town. The modified track from Latur to Osmanabad opened for traffic in September 2007. The modified rail track from Osmanabad to Kurduvadi junction became operational in October 2008 and connects Osmanabad to Pune and Mumbai by a shorter rail route than via Latur. North India also connected by this new track. Railway service is available for Nagpur to Kolhapur, Miraj to Parli, Pandharpur to Nizamabad, Pune to Hyderabad, Pune to Amarawati, Pune To Nizmabad via Osmanabad station. Tourism and Transport are developed. Osmanabad is well connected with Mumbai, Pune, Latur, Parbhani, Nanded, Amravati, Nagpur, Kolhapur, Miraj, Parli.
Osmanabad station comes under Central Railway (CR) zone.

National Highways

Below National Highways passes through the Osmanabad District.
1. NH-52: Sangrur(Punjab)-Hisar(Haryana)-Kota(Rajasthan)-Indore(Madhya Pradesh)-Dhule-Aurangabad-Beed-Osmanabad-Tuljapur-Solapur-Vijayapura-Hubballi-Ankola(Karnataka)
(Villages from Osmanabad district on this NH are- Pargaon-Kunthalgiri Phata-Terkheda-Yermala-Yedshi-Osmanabad-Tuljapur-Tamalwadi)
2. NH-63: Barshi-Yedshi-Dhoki-Murud-Latur-Udgir-Deglur-Nizamabad(Telangana)-Sironcha(Maharashtra)-Jagdalpur(Chhattisgarh)-Kotpad(Odisha)-Borigumma
3. NH-65: Pune-Indapur-Solapur-Omerga-Hyderabad-Vijayawada-Machilipatnam(Andhra Pradesh)
(Villages from Osmanabad district on this NH are- Itkal-Anadur-Naldurg-Jalkot-Yenegur-Dalimb-Omerga-Turori)
4. NH-361: Tuljapur-Latur-Ahmedpur-Nanded-Yavatmal-Wardha-Butibori(Near Nagpur)
5. NH-548B: Mantha-Selu-Pathari-Sonpeth-Parali-Ambajogai-Latur-Ausa-Omerga-Yenegur-Murum-Alur-Akkalkot-Nagansur-Vijayapura-Athani-Chikhodi-Sankeshwar-Gotur(Karnataka)
6. NH-548C: Satara-Koregaon-Mhaswad-Malshiras-Akluj-Tembhurni-Barshi-Yermala-Kalamb-Kej-Majalgaon-Partur-Mantha-Lonar-Mehkar-Khamgaon-Shegaon-Akot-Anjangaon-Betul (Madhya Pradesh)
7. NH-652: Tuljapur-Naldurg-Hannur-Akkalkot

Airport

Osmanabad Airport located 10 Kilometres north of Osmanabad, does not have any commercial air traffic. Reliance Airport Developers, who won a bid in 2009 to run the airport on a 95-year lease, plan to use this airport for aviation training. The nearest operational airports are Aurangabad Airport and Nanded Airport.

Cultural places

Dargah
A dargah (Sufi shrine is in the Osmanabad city built over the grave of a revered religious figure) of Hazrat Khwaja Shamsuddin Gazi. Located at Khwaja Nagar Dargah Road The interior decoration of the dargah consisting of many colourful glass pieces and it is so mesmerizing. The Urs of Hazrat Khwaja Shamshoddin Gazi festival celebrates in the city in the month of the Rajab of the Islamic calendar.

Tuljapur
The most famous tourist destination in Osmanabad District is in Tuljapur, which is famous for the Tuljabhavani Temple, (Marathi: श्री क्षेत्र तुळजा भवानी देवस्थान) a Hindu temple dedicated to the goddess Bhavani(Durga Or Parvati). It is considered one of the 51 Shakti Pithas. It is situated 32   km from Osmanabad and was built in c. 12th century CE.

Kanheri
Kanheri is situated in Vashi taluka. Here is a Datta Temple and a Maruti Temple.

Historical Places

Naldurg
Naldurg is another historical place in Osmanabad with a historic Naldurg Fort. The fort contains two man-made waterfalls known as Nar-Madi Dhabdhaba or Waterfalls.

Kunthalgiri
Kunthalgiri tirth consists of 11 Jain temples :
Kunthagiri is the great holy place of the Digambar, Jains and famous for Digambarpanthi Jain temple in Bhoom tahsil. 
The main temple of Kunthalgiri is Shri Kul Bhushan – Desh Bhushan Mandir known as Bara Mandir here. Shri Kul Bhushan – Desh Bhushan went to Moksha in the period of Lord Munisuvratnath. Idols of Lord Shantinath, Munisuvratnath & Adinath are present here. The main idol of the temple is of Munisuvranatha. Adinatha idol is carved in Ardh Padmasana posture and Parsvanath idol is white-colored and has 11 hoods of a cobra.

Shantinath temple built in year 1875 is also present here. Moolnayak of this temple is a 2 feet 3 inch black colder idol of Lord Shantinatha in padmasan posture. Idols of other Tirthankars and Goddess Padmavati & Sarasvati are also here. A 53 feet tall Manstambha was erected in 1944, having 4 idols of Lord Munisuvratnath installed on the top.

Bahubali Temple, Adinath Temple, Ajitnath Temple, Chaitya & Nandishwer Jinalaya, Neminath Temple, Mahaveer Temple, Kanch Mandir and Ratnatraya Temple are also present in Kunthagiri.

Ter
Temple of Lord Mahaveer is situated in this town. It is said that Samavsharan of Lord Mahaveer came here. This temple is about 800 or more years old.
An ancient temple of Lord Parsvanath is also here, during reconstruction 20, ancient idols of Teerthankars were found. Idols of Lord Mahaveer, and Lord Parsvanath are very well sculptured.
The temple of Saint Goroba is also located in Ter. This temple is one of the attractions for the tourists and pilgrims visiting Osmanabad. The temple was built in the 13th century after the death of Saint Goroba in 1317. This temple is square-shaped and constructed completely with stone. There is also a Sabha Mandap here to perform religious and cultural activities.

Yedshi Ramling Ghat Wildlife Sanctuary
Yedshi Ramling Ghat Wildlife Sanctuary is situated in the villages of Yedshi, Wadgaon and Bhanasgaon in Osmanabad Tehsil.

Paranda Fort
Paranda city of Osmanabad district contains the medieval Paranda Fort which has large canon and shell stored in the fort or artillery.

Saint Goroba Kaka Temple
Ter town near Osmanabad city having Saint Goroba Kaka Temple. Ter is also an ancient city known as Tagar. 'Lamature Museum' in the town contains many Archaeological artifacts which give proof of ancientness of Ter Town.

Mosque
Kati village in Tuljapur Division has two mosques said to be more than 500 years old. The larger is called Jamia Masjid. The smaller Masjid is older and very small with a mysterious typical architecture.

Shelagoan
Shelagoan (jagir) is a place where there is a Maruti Temple.

Mankeshwar
Mankeshwar is a place where there is a Hemadpanthi Shiv Temple and goddess Satwai Devi temple.

Yedeshwari Temple Yermala

Famous Yedeshwari Devi is on the hilltop of Yermala nearly 25 km from kalamb and 40 km from Osmanabad.

Other
Railway Circuit house in Yedshi was built in the 1870s by the British Government for top railway officers of that era. It is an architectural gem and provides a good view of the forest. The Circuit House is currently under control and administration of Indian Railway and reserved for Railway Class 1 Officers.

The district also offers some worth visiting sites to name a few are: Yedshi Ramling (Temple of Lord Shiva), Wadgaon Siddheshwar (Temple of Lord Shiva), Jain temple, Trivikram Mandir, Chaity Museum are some worth sites. New excavation is in progress & more than five hundreds things discovered at those sites.

See also
Marathwada

References

External links

 Osmanabad Business Directory
 Osmanabad Visiting Places
 Osmanabad Police
 Osmanabad official website
 Information of Tuljabhavani temple
 Osmanabad Online Archive

 
Districts of Maharashtra
Aurangabad division
Marathwada
Hyderabad State